Ruch is an unincorporated community and census-designated place (CDP) in Jackson County, Oregon, United States. It is located on Oregon Route 238, southeast of Grants Pass. As of the 2010 census it had a population of 840.

Ruch was named for Casper M. Ruch, who bought a tract of land where the community now stands in 1896. He built a blacksmith shop, a store and a house. When he was appointed postmaster of the new post office in 1897 and allowed to name it, he named it after himself. The post office closed in 1939.

There are two structures listed on the National Register of Historic Places in Ruch—McKee Bridge and Star Ranger Station.

The Ruch area is home to several Oregon wineries and is in the Applegate Valley AVA, a sub-appellation of the Rogue Valley AVA (American Viticultural Area).  A small elementary school, Ruch Elementary, is located near the center of the community.  The school serves Kindergarten - 8th grade with the Cougars as their mascot.

The Applegate River runs through the southwest edge of the valley.

Demographics

Climate
Ruch has a warm-summer Mediterranean climate (Csb) according to the Köppen climate classification system.

References

External links
Historic photo of Ruch from Salem Public Library

Unincorporated communities in Jackson County, Oregon
Populated places established in 1896
Census-designated places in Oregon
Census-designated places in Jackson County, Oregon
1896 establishments in Oregon
Unincorporated communities in Oregon